The Battle of Ugeumchi was a decisive battle during the Donghak Peasant Revolution. Fought between the Donghak Korean peasants and the combined Japanese-Joseon Army, resulted in the decline of the Donghak Rebellion and the growth of Japanese Imperialism in Korea. 

Ugeumchi refers to a pass in the Jumi Mountains (Jumisan), located within the present-day boundaries of Gongju city. The site was designated Historic Site No. 387 by the Cultural Heritage Administration in 1994.

Background 
As the Korean government had difficulty in suppressing the Donghak movement, an emissary was sent to the Qing empire to request an immediate troop dispatch. The Qing court replied by sending the necessary soldiers. Japan also sent troops on the pretext of protecting Japanese citizens in Korea. As the Chinese and Japanese armies poured into the peninsula, Jeon Bong-jun, the leader of Donghak peasants, rallied the Korean peasants and led them to once rebel against the Joseon court and drive out the foreign "devils".

Battle 
In the early stage of the battle, the peasant force gained early successes against the Joseon army. However, they began to retire when the Japanese troops arrived to reinforce the government forces. When the Donghak army advanced the second time, the Japanese, armed with modern Murata rifles and artillery, easily defeated peasants, armed only with bamboo spears and outdated matchlocks. As the peasant casualties mounted, Jeon ordered a retreat and the Donghak army scattered.

Aftermath 
After the battle, Donghak peasants fled south and battled in the consequent Battle of Taein. After defeat in Gumiran, Jeon Bongjun ordered the Donghak peasants to scatter. Jeon himself was hanged in March, 1895.

See also 
 Donghak Peasant Revolution
 First Sino-Japanese war
 Jeon Bong-jun

References

External Links
  한국민족문화대사전 (Ethnic Korean Culture Dictionary)
  동학농민혁명
  Site of Donghak Peasant Revolution

Ugeumchi
Ugeumchi
Ugeumchi
Donghak Peasant Revolution
History of South Chungcheong Province
1894 in Korea